Kunwar Sarvesh Kumar Singh also known as Rakesh Singh, is a businessman who served as the Member of Parliament from Moradabad, India from Bharatiya Janata Party. He is a veteran politician from Western Uttar Pradesh who belongs to Thakur (Rajput) caste. He is one of the Bahubali politicians in Uttar Pradesh. He was a five-term MLA from Thakurdwara from 1991 to 2007 and 2012 to 2014 till he was elected as MP from Moradabad Lok Sabha General Election in 2014. His son Kunwar Sushant Singh is currently BJP MLA from Barhapur.

Personal life
He was born on 23 December 1952 to Raja Rampal Singh, a four-time MLA from Thakurdwara and a one-time MP from Amroha. He married Kunwarani Sadhna Singh of Kookra Estate on May 26, 1983; they have one daughter and one son. He is the titular Maharaja of Saupari estate and has strong relations with Haldaur Estate and other Bijnor's princely states.

Political life
Though his father was one of the prominent leaders during the 1962 till 1989 of Congress, Singh lost many local elections. In 1991, he won his ancestral seat of Thakurdwara as the BJP candidate and remained until 2007 when Vijay Yadav from BSP won Thakurdwara. He contested from BJP in the Lok Sabha election in 2009 in Moradabad but lost to Mohammad Azharuddin. He contested the 2012 legislative election in Thakurdwara as the BJP candidate and won. In 2014 during Lok Sabha elections, he was nominated from Moradabad and he defeated Samajwadi Party candidate by a margin of 87,504 votes. He is the first BJP MP after independence to serve from Moradabad.

Properties
He owns and lives in an ancestral haveli in Ratupura Village. He owns many colleges, schools and farms and orchards in  Thakurdwara, Kashipur and Moradabad through his father's trust (Babu Rampal Singh Trust).

Kanth violence incident, 2014

After parliamentary elections in 2014, though he won the Lok Sabha constituency by a difference of 87,504 heentered lost from his own ruling Thakurdwara Vidhan Sabha Seat by difference of 475 votes. Kanth, another nearby Vidhan Sabha seat an incident pertains to the removal of a loudspeaker from the Sant Ravidas temple in Akbarpur Chaderi in Kanth. The temple attracts a large number of Dalit devotees and the loudspeaker, according to locals, had been there for several years. In early June, however, people of the Muslim community had in a written representation demanded that it be removed. The administration did not try to solve the dispute by involving elders of the two communities, and instead on Thursday, 26 June, a police team broke open the lock on its gate, entered into the temple and removed the loudspeaker. According to eyewitnesses, the policemen thrashed men and women who protested, and later arrested about a dozen people including women. The next day (Friday 27 June) a demonstration was held in main Kanth market and the crowd blocked the Moradabad-Hardwar road. The crowd was demanding that the loudspeaker be reinstalled and the arrested people be released. Amid the inaction of the police and administration, some people announced that they would install the loudspeaker themselves, and then the police cracked down on them. In the ensuing fracas several were injured. It is reported that the police went berserk after this, dragged people out of their homes and arrested them. It is said that after 26 June, district and police officials tried to win over a section of the BJP leaders and even the Moradabad MP Kunwar Sarvesh Kumar Singh, to come up with a compromise. However, as this news spread and the hardline Hindu Jagaran Manch took the matter into its own hands. The BJP then jumped into the fray and called for a mahapanchayat on this issue on 4 July. Moradabad MP Kunwar Sarvesh Kumar Singh, Amroha MP Kunwar Singh Tanwar, Sambhal MP Satyapal Saini, Rampur MP Nepal Singh, MLA Sangeet Som and their supporters were briefly detained when they were arriving for the mahapanchayat. Sangeet Som is also an accused in the Muzaffarangar Riots. Moradabad district magistrate Chandrakant was seriously injured Friday when a mob threw stones at policemen after the BJP leaders' arrest. The official was sent to hospital for a serious head and eye injury. BJP supporters fought at Kanth as police carried out lathi charge, lobbed teargas shells and shot blanks in the air to disperse the crowds which had stopped some trains. The district administration was more intent on stopping the mahapanchayat rather than solving the issue, he said. The state BJP has constituted a four-member team that will look into the incident and submit a report to the party leadership. Senior Superintendent of Police (SSP) of Moradabad, Dharamvir Yadav, in an uncharacteristically political statement, on Saturday blamed the BJP for the tense situation in Kanth, and said that BJP MP Kunwar Sarvesh Kumar Singh had wanted to "polarise the situation ahead of the by-elections to be held in the state." He said the BJP's mahapanchayat call had only added to the already volatile situation.

Legacy
He is the first ever MP after independence from BJP serving from Moradabad. He was only serving MLA from Thakurdwara for serving the most from this constituency in Assembly Elections for five terms all on BJP tickets. He launched several developmental schemes in this region and has also tried hard to get loan facility better for farmers, small businesses and large businesses. For that he has involved various national as well as regional banks in his prospective financial projects. This parliamentarian has worked on a number of developmental projects and constructive activities, which include the laying foundation of schools/colleges, appointing of school teachers, civic buildings, long-delayed bridges, getting roads constructed and qualified doctors working in primary health centres in Moradabad. He has also donated much money to NGO Janata Shiksha Prasar Samiti for development of this region.

Posts held in Parliament

See also
Kunwar Sushant Singh
Manoj Kumar Chauhan
Kunwar Bhartendra Singh

References

1952 births
Living people
Bharatiya Janata Party politicians from Uttar Pradesh
Uttar Pradesh MLAs 1991–1993
Uttar Pradesh MLAs 1993–1996
Uttar Pradesh MLAs 1997–2002
Uttar Pradesh MLAs 2002–2007
People from Moradabad district
India MPs 2014–2019
Lok Sabha members from Uttar Pradesh
Uttar Pradesh MLAs 2012–2017